The 1982 World Rowing Championships were World Rowing Championships that were held from 28 to 29 August 1982 at Rotsee in Lucerne, Switzerland.

Medal summary

Men's events

Women's events

Medal table

References

World Rowing Championships
International sports competitions hosted by Switzerland
Rowing competitions in Switzerland
Sport in Lucerne
World Rowing Championships
1982 in Swiss sport
Rowing